Simo Rrumbullaku (born 30 December 1991) is an Albanian professional footballer who plays as a left-back for Super League Greece club Ionikos.

Club career
He started his senior club career at Kalamata F.C., playing in Football League 2. In 2012, he moved to PAS Giannina who play in Superleague Greece. Since 2014 Roumpoulakos has played for Panaitolikos, although he had a lone spell at Panegialios in 2015.

Kukësi
On 23 December 2016, Rrumbullaku returned in Albania and joined top flight side Kukësi on an 18-month contract, taking squad number 20. He made his first Kukësi appearance on 27 January in team's first match of 2017 by starting in the 1–0 win at Vllaznia Shkodër. During the second part of 2016–17 season, Rrumbullaku played 10 league matches, all of them as starter, collecting 878 minutes. He concluded the season by winning the championship, which was his first career silverware and Kukësi's first ever championship.

He scored his first career goal on 16 November 2017 with a long-range shot in the 2–2 away draw against Kamza in the 2017–18 Albanian Superliga matchday 10. He dedicated the goal to his father.

International career
Internationally, Roumpoulakos is eligible to play for Greece and Albania.

Honours
Kalamata
Delta Ethniki: 2010–11
Kukësi
Albanian Superliga: 2016–17
Albanian Cup: 2018–19
UTA Arad
Liga II: 2019–20

References

External links
 Profile - FSHF
 
 Myplayer.gr Profile
 Onsports.gr Profile

1991 births
Living people
Footballers from Gjirokastër
Albanian footballers
Greek people of Albanian descent
Albanian emigrants to Greece
Association football fullbacks
Kalamata F.C. players
PAS Giannina F.C. players
Panetolikos F.C. players
Panegialios F.C. players
Apollon Smyrnis F.C. players
FK Kukësi players
FC UTA Arad players
AFC Chindia Târgoviște players
Kategoria Superiore players
Liga I players
Liga II players
Albanian expatriate footballers
Albanian expatriate sportspeople in Romania
Expatriate footballers in Albania